Ulmus glabra 'Pyrenaica' is a local cultivar of the Wych Elm, described as Ulmus pyrenaica, the Pyrenees Elm, by de Lapeyrouse in Supplément à l'Histoire abrégée des plantes des Pyrénées (1818), from trees in the Port [:pass] de la Picade in the Basses-Pyrenees. Chevalier added a further description in 'Les Ormes de France' (1942), and a second provenance in the nearby Bagnères-de-Luchon area. Herbarium specimens are held in the Muséum national d'histoire naturelle in Paris, where U. campestris var. montana latifolia is given as a synonym (see 'External links').

Description
An elm to 12 m tall, with long branches, spreading at first, then pendulous, with smooth bark. The leathery leaves are large (about 20 cm long, 10 to 12 wide), oval, almost equal-sided, tapering and almost wedge-shaped at the base, with an abrupt but long, narrow and pointed apex (3 to 4 cm); upper surface rough, lower almost smooth; deeply double-toothed. Leaf-shoots are very downy. The samara is shallowly notched, with the seed central.

Pests and diseases
See under Ulmus glabra.

Cultivation
Lapeyrouse reported that the elm was much cultivated in its local area for use by wheelwrights. The naturalist Désveaux, who studied the tree and annotated the Paris herbarium specimens of it, reported that propagation plans were afoot, "car c'est un bel arbre d'ornement" [:as it is a fine ornamental tree].

References

External links
"Muséum national d'histoire naturelle, spécimen P06883087" Sheet labelled U. campestris var. montana latifolia, Pyrénées 1830

Wych elm cultivar
Ulmus articles missing images
Ulmus
Missing elm cultivars